Robert (Bob) Arthur Haugen (June 26, 1942 – January 6, 2013) was a financial economist and a pioneer in the field of quantitative investing and low-volatility investing. He was President of Haugen Custom Financial Systems and also consulted and spoke globally.

Career 
While he has contributed   research to the fields of insurance, real estate and equity investments, he is probably best known as a vocal critic of the efficient market hypothesis and the Capital Asset Pricing Model (CAPM). With his former professor, A. James Heins , he discovered in the late 60s and early 70s that, contrary to the prevailing theory, low risk stocks actually produce higher returns. The resulting article bestowed on him the unofficial designation of “father of low volatility investing.” He was also the inventor of the Expected Return Factor Model.  He was vocal concerning the evidence supporting market inefficiency and documented the low volatility anomaly and other quantitative factors such as value and momentum.

During the academic portion of his career he held endowed professorships at the University of Wisconsin, the University of Illinois, and the University of California. Based on articles published in the top academic journals in financial economics, Haugen has been ranked as the 17th most prolific researcher in finance . The New Finance was required reading for the Chartered Financial Analyst (CFA) exam.

Haugen earned his B.S. (1965; magna cum laude), M.S. (1966), and Ph.D. in Financial economics  (1968) from the University of Illinois at Champaign-Urbana.

Selected publications 
 On the Evidence Supporting the Existence of Risk Premiums in the Capital Market, Robert A. Haugen and A. James Heins, Wisconsin working Paper Dec. 1972.
 Risk and the Rate of Return on Financial Assets: Some Old Wine in New Bottles, Robert A. Haugen and A. James Heins, Journal of Financial and Quantitative Analysis, 775-784 December 1975.
 Resolving the Agency Problems of External Capital Through Options, Robert A. Haugen and Lemma W. Senbet, 1981, The Journal of Finance, June.
 Agency Problems and Financial Contracting, 1985, Robert Haugen, Amir Barnea and Lemma W. Senbet, Prentice Hall, Upper Saddle River, NJ.
 Modern Investment Theory, 1986, revised 1990, 1993, 1996, 2001, Prentice Hall, Upper Saddle River, NJ.
 The Role of Options in the Resolutions of Agency Problems: A Reply, Robert A. Haugen and Lemma W. Senbet, 1986, The Journal of Finance, December.
 The Incredible January Effect, 1987, co-authored with Josef Lakonishok, Dow Jones Irwin, Homewood, IL.
 The Effect of Volatility Changes on the Level of Stock Prices and Expected Future Returns, Robert A. Haugen, Eli Talmor, and Walter Torous, The Journal of Finance, May 1991.
 The New Finance: The Case Against Efficient Markets, 1995 (1st Edition), 1999 (2nd Edition), Prentice Hall, Upper Saddle River, NJ.
 The New Finance: Overreaction, Complexity and Uniqueness, 2003 (3rd Edition), 2009 (4th Edition), Prentice Hall, Upper Saddle River, NJ.
 Commonality of the Determinants of Expected Stock Returns, Robert Haugen and Nardin Baker, Journal of Financial Economics 1996.
 Beast on Wall Street,1998, Prentice Hall, Upper Saddle River, NJ.
 The Inefficient Stock Market—What Pays Off and Why,1999, Prentice Hall, Upper Saddle River, NJ.

External links 

 Haugen Custom Financial Systems official site
Obituary

References

American businesspeople
American consultants
People from Chicago
1942 births
2013 deaths
CFA charterholders
Financial economists
University of Illinois alumni
University of Wisconsin–Madison faculty
University of Illinois faculty
University of California faculty